Nathaniel or Nathanael Greene may refer to:

 Nathanael Greene (1742–1786), American Revolutionary War general
 SS Nathanael Greene, a Liberty ship
 Nathaniel Greene (journalist) (1797–1877), American journalist
 Nathaniel Greene Foster (1809–1869), American politician, lawyer, and military officer
 Major General Nathanael Greene (Brown), a bronze statue of Nathanael Greene by Henry Kirke Brown
 Nathanael Greene (Brown), a marble statue of Nathanael Greene by Henry Kirke Brown

See also
Nathaniel Everett Green (1823–1899), English painter and astronomer
Nathan Greene (lawyer) (c. 1902–1964), American lawyer
Nathan Green (disambiguation)